Richard Michael Wallace (born 16 January 1968) is a former Garryowen, Munster, Saracens, Ireland and Lions rugby union player. He was a winger and gained 29 caps with the Ireland national rugby union team. He was a member of the first Munster team to compete in the Heineken Cup.  He made his full international debut in 1991 against Namibia. He is the all-time top try scorer for the Ireland national rugby sevens team in Rugby World Cup Sevens with 10 tries.

His younger brothers Paul Wallace and David Wallace also played rugby for Ireland. He later became an airline pilot for CityJet.

References

External links
ESPN Scrum profile
Sporting Heroes profile
Munster profile

 

Living people
1968 births
Munster Rugby players
Garryowen Football Club players
Irish rugby union players
Ireland international rugby union players
British & Irish Lions rugby union players from Ireland
Saracens F.C. players
Commercial aviators
Rugby union players from County Cork
Ireland international rugby sevens players